Koválovec is a village and municipality in Skalica District in the Trnava Region of western Slovakia.

History
In historical records the village was first mentioned in 1394.

Geography
The municipality lies at an altitude of 263 metres and covers an area of 8.492 km². It has a population of about 136 people.

Genealogical resources
The records for genealogical research are available at the state archive "Statny Archiv in Bratislava, Slovakia"

 Roman Catholic church records (births/marriages/deaths): 1635-1927 (parish B)

See also
 List of municipalities and towns in Slovakia

References

External links

 Official page
https://web.archive.org/web/20071027094149/http://www.statistics.sk/mosmis/eng/run.html
Surnames of living people in Kovalovec

Villages and municipalities in Skalica District